Torah finials or  rimonim / rimmonim ((lit. "pomegranates"), singular: rimmon / rimon) are silver or gold finials adorning the top ends of the rollers of a Sefer Torah (Torah scroll).  Very often the rimonim are adorned with little bells and are very intricate.

See also
Torah crown

References

Jewish art
Torah